Great Britain has introduced postal services throughout the world and has often made use of British definitives bearing local overprints. The following is a partial list of British postal services abroad. The list does not include agencies in South America, such as in Buenos Aires, Rio de Janeiro and Valparaiso.

British post offices abroad
 British post offices in Africa various issues
 Baghdad (British Occupation)	1917 only
 Bangkok (British Post Office)	1882–1885
 Batum (British Occupation)	1919–1920
 Beirut (British Post Office)	1906 only
 British post offices in the Turkish Empire	1885–1923
 British postal agencies in Eastern Arabia	1948–1966
 Bushire (British Occupation)	1915 only
 Cameroons (British Occupation)	1915 only
 China (British Post Offices)	1917–1930
 China (British Railway Administration)	1901 only
 Crete (British Post Offices)	1898–1899
 East Africa Forces	1943–1948
 British post in Egypt (Consular Offices)	1839–1882
 British post in Egypt (British Military Occupation)	1882–1914
 Egypt (British Forces)	1932–1943
 Eritrea (British Administration)	1950–1952
 Eritrea (British Military Administration)	1948–1950
 German East Africa (British Occupation)	1917 only
 Iraq (British Occupation)	1918–1923
 Japan (British Commonwealth Occupation)	1946–1949
 Japan (British Post Offices)	1859–1879
 Mafia Island (British Occupation)	1915–1916
 Malaya (British Military Administration)	1945–1948
 Middle East Forces (MEF)	1942–1947
 Morocco Agencies	1898–1957
 North Borneo (BMA)	1945 only
 Salonika (British Field Office)	1916 only
 Sarawak (BMA)	1945 only
 Somalia (British Administration)	1950 only
 Somalia (British Military Administration)	1948–1950
 Tangier	1927–1957
 Tripolitania (British Administration)	1950–1952
 Tripolitania (British Military Administration)	1948–1950
 Uzunada, formerly Chustan Island (British Occupation)	1916 only

See also 
 Postage stamps and postal history of Great Britain

References

Bibliography 
 Proud, Edward B. The Postal History of the British Post Offices Abroad. Heathfield, E.Sussex: Proud-Bailey Co. Ltd., 1991  551p.
 
 
 Wood, Hugh W. British Post Offices Abroad: Display given to the Royal Philatelic Society London, 30th April 2009. London: The Author, 2009 103p.

External links 
 AskPhil – Glossary of Stamp Collecting Terms
 Encyclopaedia of Postal Authorities

Postal system of the United Kingdom
Postage stamps of the United Kingdom

it:Storia postale inglese